Carlo Camilieri-Gioia (born 14 May 1975) is a Belgian former professional footballer who played in the Football League for Mansfield Town.

References

1975 births
living people
Belgian footballers
Association football midfielders
English Football League players
Mansfield Town F.C. players
R. Charleroi S.C. players
Standard Liège players
Belgian expatriate footballers
Expatriate footballers in England
Belgian expatriate sportspeople in England